Djin is the fourth and final studio album by English alternative rock band Queenadreena. The album was originally released exclusively in Japan in October 2008, where it became the band's most commercially successful album to date, peaking at #120 on the Oricon Albums Chart. The album was later released in the UK in September 2009. Djin was re-released in a limited edition, gatefold double neon pink vinyl set by Cadiz Entertainment on 16 April 2021.  The reissue included additional new demo tracks and a previously unheard song “Heaven Doesn't Wait,” co-written and recorded with the late Andy Gill from Gang of Four.

Critical response
Alan Severa of AllMusic awarded the album four out of five stars, referring to it as Queenadreena's "masterpiece, balancing all their characteristically mercurial elements on the solid basis of the mastery of an accomplished band, which was left by the media to grow at its own pace." Sputnikmusic awarded the album a 4.0 "excellent" rating, noting: "Djin is an album that is very consistent with the band's previous work. It is a very catchy "garage/noise rock" album with some great dirty punk riffs and solos  with an amazing and unique female voice."

The independent music site Delusions of Adequacy wrote: "Djin is full of the balls-out, sleazy, filth ridden tracks you’d expect from the band... There’s more sophistication on this album also, and more desire to experiment, with some of the songs being noticeably longer than they have been on previous offerings... Overall, this is a much more mature offering, whilst not losing any of the energy the band are known for."

Track listing

Personnel 
Queenadreena
 KatieJane Garsidevocals
 Crispin Grayguitar
 Nomi Leonardbass
 Pete Howarddrums

Technical personnel
Teo Millerproduction, mixing

Charts

References 

2008 albums
Queenadreena albums